Reshma Gandhi (born 16 December 1974 in Ahmednagar, Maharashtra) is a former One Day International cricketer who represented India.  She is a right-handed batsman and wicket-keeper.

International career
She has played two ODIs as a wicket keeper and also scored an unbeaten century.

Gandhi is one among the five woman cricketers who have scored hundred on debut match. It was in Ireland against Ireland women's cricket team in 1999. She, along with Mithali Raj had an partnership of unbroken 258 runs, where Gandhi scored 104 runs while Raj scored an unbeaten 114 runs.

References

1974 births
India women One Day International cricketers
Indian women cricketers
Living people
Mumbai women cricketers
Railways women cricketers
Women cricketers who made a century on One Day International debut
People from Ahmednagar
Wicket-keepers